Rhodeus pseudosericeus  is a temperate freshwater fish belonging to the Acheilognathinae subfamily of the  family Cyprinidae.  It originated in the Namhan River system in the  Gyeonggi-do and Gangwon-do provinces of Korea.  It was originally described as Acanthorhodeus atremius by Jordan & Thompson in 1914. The fish reaches a length up to 6.1 cm (2.4 in). When spawning, the females deposit their eggs inside bivalves, where they hatch and the young remain until they can swim.

References

pseudosericeus
Fish described in 2001